36206 is the sixth full-length album of the Seattle rock band Sledgeback. Released in 2016 by Grundrecords, the sound of the album is general punk rock.

Track listing
"Unchosen" - 1.28
"Éjjeli Járat" - 3:25
"Kids of the street" - 2:58
"Kirakatfeleség" - 2:43
"Múló Állapot" - 2:41
"System" - 2:56
"Búcsúlevél" - 3:31
"Maradék Élet" - 3:12
"No destination" - 2:49
"Hagyj Élni" - 3:04
"Jól Vagyok" - 2:50 
"Wasted" - 2:16
"Úton" - 3:32
"Gotti" - 1:02
"The hate" - 3.18

Catalog number
Catalog number: GR060

References

Sledgeback albums
2016 albums
Punk rock albums by American artists